Zoar was a settlement in Newfoundland and Labrador. It was settled in 1865 as one of several Moravian Church missions to the Inuit in Labrador, on the so-called "Moravian Coast," but was abandoned in 1889, one of the first such communities to be abandoned.

References 

Ghost towns in Newfoundland and Labrador
History of the Labrador Province of the Moravian Church